Let Me Entertain You may refer to:

Film and television
 Let Me Entertain You (2006 TV series), a British daytime variety show
 Let Me Entertain You (2014 TV series), a British entertainment show
 Let Me Entertain You, an Irish TV talent show
 "Let Me Entertain You" (Desperate Housewives)

Music

Albums
 Let Me Entertain You, a 1996 album by Ann-Margret
 Let Me Entertain You: Carol Burnett Sings, a 2000 album by Carol Burnett
 Let Me Entertain You (Amanda Lear album), a 2016 album by Amanda Lear

Songs
 "Let Me Entertain You" (Robbie Williams song)
 "Let Me Entertain You" (Gypsy), a song from Gypsy: A Musical Fable by Jule Styne and Stephen Sondheim
 "Let Me Entertain You" (Queen song), from the 1978 album Jazz
 "Let Me Entertain You", a song by The Controllers
 "Let Me Entertain You", a song by Shakespears Sister from Hormonally Yours

Other
 Let Me Entertain You Tour, a 2015 tour by Robbie Williams
 Let Me Entertain You, 1990 autobiography of David Brown